Adão e Eva is a 1995 Portuguese film directed by Joaquim Leitão.

Cast
Maria de Medeiros
Joaquim de Almeida
Ana Bustorff
Karra Elejalde
Cristina Carvalhal

Reception
It won the 1996 Portuguese Golden Globe for Best Film, as well as Best Director, Best Actor (Joaquim de Almeida) and the Best Actress (Maria de Medeiros).

References

External links

1995 drama films
1995 films
Films directed by Joaquim Leitão
Films set in Portugal
Portuguese drama films
Portuguese LGBT-related films
LGBT-related drama films
Golden Globes (Portugal) winners
1995 LGBT-related films
1990s Portuguese-language films